Piedras is a station on Line A of the Buenos Aires Underground. It is located underneath the Avenida de Mayo in the neighbourhood of Monserrat and one of its entrances is located next to the famous Café Tortoni. The station belonged to the inaugural section of the Buenos Aires Underground opened on 1 December 1913, which linked the stations Plaza Miserere and Plaza de Mayo.

References

External links

Buenos Aires Underground stations
Railway stations opened in 1913
1913 establishments in Argentina